Mátralába is a hilly region north of Mátra Mountains in Hungary.
Regions of Hungary

See also
Geography of Hungary
North Hungarian Mountains
Mátra

References

Geography of Hungary